Clathropsis is a genus of minute sea snails, marine gastropod molluscs in the family Cerithiopsidae.

Species
Species in the genus Clathropsis include:
 
 Clathropsis abelai Cecalupo & Perugia, 2014
 Clathropsis acutissima Cecalupo & Perugia, 2013
 Clathropsis albida Cecalupo & Perugia, 2019
 Clathropsis alternata (Laseron, 1951)
 Clathropsis annelaurae Cecalupo & Perugia, 2018
 Clathropsis apexlevis Cecalupo & Perugia, 2017
 Clathropsis araii Cecalupo & Perugia, 2019
 Clathropsis arcangelae Cecalupo & Perugia, 2017
 Clathropsis atimovatae Cecalupo & Perugia, 2014
 Clathropsis berthaultorum Cecalupo & Perugia, 2017
 Clathropsis bicarinata (Laseron, 1951)
 Clathropsis bugeae Cecalupo & Perugia, 2014
 Clathropsis caledonica Cecalupo & Perugia, 2017
 Clathropsis castelinae Cecalupo & Perugia, 2014
 Clathropsis cesairei Cecalupo & Perugia, 2014
 Clathropsis charlesi Cecalupo & Perugia, 2014
 Clathropsis chatenayi Cecalupo & Perugia, 2017
 Clathropsis chinoi Cecalupo & Perugia, 2019
 Clathropsis corbariae Cecalupo & Perugia, 2014
 Clathropsis coronata Cecalupo & Perugia, 2016
 Clathropsis cuspidiformis Cecalupo & Perugia, 2017
 Clathropsis darwinensis Laseron, 1956
 Clathropsis doimanensis Cecalupo & Perugia, 2017
 Clathropsis ellenstrongae Cecalupo & Perugia, 2012
 Clathropsis eugenei Cecalupo & Perugia, 2014
 Clathropsis fulvocincta Cecalupo & Perugia, 2019
 Clathropsis fuzzii Cecalupo & Perugia, 2014
 Clathropsis gemmunziae Cecalupo & Perugia, 2017
 Clathropsis germanai Cecalupo & Perugia, 2018
 Clathropsis iheyaensis Cecalupo & Perugia, 2019
 Clathropsis impedita Laseron, 1956
 Clathropsis joannotae Cecalupo & Perugia, 2017
 Clathropsis laurenti Cecalupo & Perugia, 2017
 Clathropsis lifouensis Cecalupo & Perugia, 2017
 Clathropsis lorenzinii Cecalupo & Perugia, 2012
 Clathropsis luteocincta Cecalupo & Perugia, 2013
 Clathropsis mafeaensis Cecalupo & Perugia, 2013
 Clathropsis maritima Laseron, 1956
 Clathropsis marshalli Cecalupo & Perugia, 2017
 Clathropsis matsukii Cecalupo & Perugia, 2019
 Clathropsis mellita Laseron, 1956
 Clathropsis multispirae Cecalupo & Perugia, 2012
 Clathropsis okutanii Cecalupo & Perugia, 2019
 Clathropsis oliverioi Cecalupo & Perugia, 2018
 Clathropsis ornata Cecalupo & Perugia, 2014
 Clathropsis pallens Cecalupo & Perugia, 2012
 Clathropsis payriae Cecalupo & Perugia, 2014
 Clathropsis peculiaris Cecalupo & Perugia, 2014
 Clathropsis pianii Cecalupo & Perugia, 2018
 Clathropsis pinedai Cecalupo & Perugia, 2013
 Clathropsis pulchella Cecalupo & Perugia, 2012
 Clathropsis quaterstriata Cecalupo & Perugia, 2012
 Clathropsis rendai Cecalupo & Perugia, 2018
 Clathropsis repettoi Cecalupo & Perugia, 2018
 Clathropsis semiclara Cecalupo & Perugia, 2012
 Clathropsis sparacioi Cecalupo & Perugia, 2018
 Clathropsis subrosea Cecalupo & Perugia, 2013
 Clathropsis tavianii Cecalupo & Perugia, 2018
 Clathropsis thornleyana Laseron, 1956
 Clathropsis tripilia (Laseron, 1951)
 Clathropsis tuanainaii Cecalupo & Perugia, 2014
 Clathropsis turreta Laseron, 1956
 Clathropsis zamamiensis Cecalupo & Perugia, 2019
 Clathropsis zannii Cecalupo & Perugia, 2012

Species brought into synonymy
 Clathropsis poppearum Cecalupo & Perugia, 2012: synonym of Costulopsis poppearum (Cecalupo & Perugia, 2012) (original combination)

References

 Laseron C. (1956). The family Cerithiopsidae (Mollusca) from the Solanderian and Dampierian zoogeographical provinces. Australian Journal of Marine and Freshwater Research. 7(1): 151-182.
 Cecalupo A. & Perugia I. (2012) Family Cerithiopsidae H. Adams & A. Adams, 1853 in the central Philippines (Caenogastropoda: Triphoroidea). Quaderni della Civica Stazione Idrobiologica di Milano 30: 1-262.
 Cecalupo, A., & Perugia, I., 2014. The Cerithiopsidae (Caenogastropoda: Triphoroidea) of South Madagascar (Indian Ocean). Bollettino Malacologico 50: 75-126
New species of Cerithiopsidae (Gastropoda: Triphoroidea) from Papua New Guinea (Pacific Ocean). Visaya Suppl. 11: 1-187

Cerithiopsidae
Gastropod genera